Rajnish Kumar (August 17, 1960 – August 27, 2019) was a politician in India. He was a member of Punjab Legislative Assembly and represented Mukerian. He was the son of former Punjab Assembly Speaker and finance minister Kewal Krishan.

Family
He was the son of former Punjab Assembly Speaker and finance minister Kewal Krishan.

Political career
Rajnish Kumar first unsuccessfully contested the Punjab Legislative Assembly elections in 2007 from Mukerian as a Congress candidate. During the 2012 Punjab assembly elections, Congress nominated Ajit Kumar Narang from Mukerian. Rajnish Kumar decided to contest as an independent candidate, for which he was expelled from Congress. He successfully contested and became a member of the Punjab Legislative assembly by defeating 2nd placed BJP candidate Arunesh Kumar by more than 12 thousand votes. The Congress nominee came 3rd.

References

1960 births
2019 deaths
Punjab, India MLAs 2012–2017
Place of birth missing
Punjab, India MLAs 2017–2022
Indian National Congress politicians from Punjab, India